Parliament Street is a  long street in the city of Exeter, Devon, England. It links the High Street to Waterbeer Street and dates from the 14th century.

It was formerly called Small Lane and was renamed when Parliament was derided by the city council for passing the 1832 Reform Bill. It was called Parliament Alley, immediately after the name change from Small Lane. The authorities and some of the public thought that an alley was "too common", for some reason,  so it was changed to Parliament Street circa 1850. Today it attracts tourists, who have no idea that in reality it is only an alley or alleyway. In 1836 the residents of Waterbeer Street subscribed £130 to have Parliament Street widened, but nothing was done about this.

See also 

 L'Androuno, : A narrow street in France 
 Fan Tan Alley, : A narrow street in Canada
 Mårten Trotzigs Gränd, : A narrow street in Sweden
 Strada Sforii, : A narrow street in Romania
 Spreuerhofstraße, : A narrow street in Germany
 Qianshi hutong, : The narrowest hutong in Beijing

References

Streets in England
Exeter
Pedestrian streets in the United Kingdom